Lapian may refer to:
 Elyah Lopian
 Lapian, Iran, a village in Razavi Khorasan Province